Amora Bettany is a Brazilian video game artist based in São Paulo. Her work can be seen in Out There Somewhere, Celeste and TowerFall (2013). She prefers to work on concept and high resolution art, which is later pixelated by her former partner Pedro Medeiros or used in game as it is.

Biography 
Bettany started Miniboss, a video game studio, in 2010. In 2014, they partnered with Alpaca Team to create Indie House SP.

Games

References 

Year of birth missing (living people)
Living people
Brazilian people in the video game industry
Brazilian artists
People from São Paulo